The MGWR class E was a small 0-6-0T steam locomotive class designed in 1891 by Martin Atock, the then locomotive superintendent of the Midland Great Western Railway (MGWR) and twelve engines were built.  After the MGWR was merged into Great Southern Railways (GSR) in 1925 they were designated Class 551 or J26.  They were also known as the Irish Terrier class.

Locomotives

Design and historical development

The MGWR Class E were initially intended for shunting around the Dublin Broadstone terminus.   Further locomotives were ordered for rural and small branch line work around Killala, Achill, Clifden, Athboy and Kingscourt.

After the grouping of 1925, the Great Southern Railways classified them Class 551 or Class J26, and fitted them with new smokeboxes, safety valves and chimneys. The nameplates, builder’s plates and sandbox numbers were removed at this time and replaced with a numberplate.

After 1920 they were forced to move from the Achill branch when that became restricted for 6 wheel coupled locomotives.

Their low axle loading gave them good utility and they were often popular, though some duties stretched their abilities.

Three engines, 553, 555 and 560 were fitted with enlarged cabs and modified footsteps.  This enabled an additional ton of coal to be carried and they successfully worked on the enclosed Waterford and Tramore section.

Model 
An etched-brass kit of the Class E / J26 has been produced by Studio Scale Models including brass etches and cast white metal parts.

See also
 Diesel Locomotives of Ireland
 Multiple Units of Ireland
 Coaching Stock of Ireland
 Steam locomotives of Ireland

References

Sharp Stewart locomotives
Kitson locomotives
0-6-0T locomotives
Railway locomotives introduced in 1891
5 ft 3 in gauge locomotives
Steam locomotives of Ireland
Scrapped locomotives
E